State Route 115 (SR 115) is a  state highway that runs west-to-east in the northeastern part of the U.S. state of Georgia. It travels through portions of Lumpkin, White, and Habersham counties.

Route description

SR 115 begins just northeast of the Chestatee River at an intersection with US 19/SR 60 (South Chestatee Street), south of Dahlonega, in Lumpkin County. This intersection marks the northern terminus of SR 400. South of this intersection, US 19/SR 400 make up the Hospitality Highway, a freeway that provides access to Atlanta. It heads northeast to an intersection with SR 52, east of the town. In a curving fashion, SR 115 heads northeast into White County and intersects with the western terminus of SR 284 (Shoal Creek Church Road). Then, it enters Cleveland, where it meets US 129/SR 11 (Main Street). On the eastern edge of town is Truett-McConnell College. Just east of the town is an intersection with the western terminus of SR 255. To the southeast is SR 384 (Duncan Bridge Road). Immediately after is an intersection with the eastern terminus of SR 254. About  later, the route passes over the Chattahoochee River into Habersham County. To the northeast is an intersection with SR 105 (Cannon Bridge Road). Just before entering Clarkesville, Georgia is an intersection with the southern terminus SR 17 Connector and the beginning of a concurrency with SR 17 (Unicoi Turnpike). The two highways travel to the southeast until entering the town. Almost immediately is a crossing over the Soque River. They curve to the northeast until they intersect SR 197/SR 385 (Washington Street, which is part of the old route of US 441). At this intersection, SR 115 ends, and SR 17 heads south concurrent with SR 197/SR 385. The highway is mostly rural, except for the segments in Cleveland and Clarkesville. 

All of SR 115 west of the intersection with SR 105 is part of the National Highway System, a system of roadways important to the nation's economy, defense, and mobility.

Major intersections

See also

References

External links

 Georgia Roads (Routes 101-120)
 Georgia State Route 115 on State-Ends.com

115
Transportation in Lumpkin County, Georgia
Transportation in White County, Georgia
Transportation in Habersham County, Georgia